OUANANI is a world music group formed in 2004 in Montréal by Sadio "Djali Sadio" Sissokho from Dakar, Senegal and Jean "Jean Jean" Girard-Arsenault from Alma, Québec, Canada.

They play as a duo or with musicians from all over the world. They sing in many languages : French, Wolof, Khassonke, Spanish and English. With organic-electronic sounds and a self-deprecating sense of humour, OUANANI fuses Québec with Africa, Caribbean and Latin America.

OUANANI tangles a wide variety of themes such as immigration, racism, love, seduction and surrealism.

Some of their accreditations include the following :
 Album of the Week (ICI, 2008)
 Three times #1 on CIBL's Francophone charts in 2008
 Audience Award at The festival International de la Chanson de Granby in 2004

Discography

Studio album

"Vote etnik" produced by Jean Arsenault, Ouanani 2007 in Montreal, Canada

Single

"La Chikunguña" (Ivan Duran mix, Stonetree Records, 2017) – 3:31 – Words & music : Jean Arsenault.

Produced and recorded in 2016-2017 by Jean Arsenault in Barranquilla & Palenque, Colombia and Montreal, Canada.

Flavio Andrés : Bass, Guitar
Jean Arsenault : Voice
Pocho Cien : Drum
Jorge "Salpi" Guerrero : Guitar 	
Febe Merab : Voice 	
Leang Manjarres Wong : Gaita
Ronnie Maury : Bass
Keila Miranda : Voice 	
Sadio Sissokho : Voice, djembe	

Angel Alvarez : Photos
Manuel Angulo - ABC records : Edition
Jean Arsenault - Ouanani : Production, recording, edition
Ivan Duran - Stonetree Records : Recording, edition, mix, mastering 
Einar Escaf - Einar Escaf Producciones : Recording, edition
Simon L'Espérance : Edition
Jean Massicotte - Studio Masterkut : Recording, edition
Tutuk Muntu : Graphic design

Video

VIDEO

"Nous Matraquer" produced by CUTV and Ouanani, July 2012
Directed & edited by : Chico Peres, CUTV 2012
Kinetic Typing Animation : Hugo Alves
Cameraman : Chico Peres, Nawfal Zamani
Dance : Yesenia Pulido, P'andanza

SONG

Words : Gabriel Nadeau-Dubois, Jean Charest, policier mal élevé, Alexander « Ramon Chicharrón » Betancur, Jean « Jean Jean » Girard-Arsenault, fille furieuse, Amir Khadir, Stéphane Hessel, Dominic Champagne, Charles de Gaulle
Music : Samuel « Samito » Matsinhe,  Alexander « Ramon Chicharron » Betancur,  Jean « Jean Jean » Girard-Arsenault, Sadio « Djali Sadio » Sissokho
Production : Jean "Jean Jean" Arsenault, Ouanani 2012
Recording, programmation, mix : Pablo Bonacina, Bonabona Musik 2012
Guitar, congas, voice :  Alexander « Ramon Chicharron » Betancur
Kora, voice : Sadio « Djali Sadio » Sissokho
Voice :  Jean « Jean Jean » Girard-Arsenault
Text correction : Marie-Julie Desrochers

References

External links
Official website
Devoir's newspaper
RFI - Quebec's Ouanani Republic 
Nous matraquer videoclip

Musical groups established in 2004
Musical groups from Montreal
Canadian world music groups
2004 establishments in Quebec